Eoophyla cameroonensis is a moth in the family Crambidae. It was described by David John Lawrence Agassiz in 2012. It is found in Cameroon, where it is only known from the lowlands.

The wingspan is about 19 mm. The forewings are ochreous white with a fuscous spot on the costa, a yellow postmedian fascia and a fuscous strigula followed by white. The terminal area is yellow. The hindwings are white basally, with a yellow median fascia.

References

Eoophyla
Moths described in 2012